The Florida Derby is an American Thoroughbred horse race for three-year-old horses held annually at Gulfstream Park in Hallandale Beach, Florida. Since 2005, it has been run five weeks before the Kentucky Derby, which is held on the first Saturday in May. Thus the Florida Derby is currently run either at the end of March or the beginning of April. Added to the racing schedule in 1952, the Grade I race is run at  miles on the dirt. The purse was increased to $1 million in 2011 but was reduced to $750,000 for 2020 and 2021 due to the COVID-19 pandemic. The purse was once again increased to $1 million in 2022.

History
The Florida Derby was first run in 1952. It has long been a prestigious prep race for the Kentucky Derby and since 2013 has been part of the official Road to the Kentucky Derby.

The race was originally run in early to mid-March and Kentucky Derby hopefuls would then run in another major prep race in April. In 2005, Gulfstream Park shifted its scheduling to run the race five weeks before the Kentucky Derby. This was originally believed to be a liability, as the preferred spacing of races is typically three to four weeks. When Barbaro won the 2006 Kentucky Derby, the five-week spacing began to be viewed as a potentially positive feature, allowing a horse to come into the Kentucky Derby well rested.

In 1977, a large field resulted in the race being run in two divisions.

Between 1926 and 1937, the Flamingo Stakes was known as the Florida Derby.

Triple Crown Classic Winners

In total, 20 winners of the Florida Derby have gone on to win one or more Triple Crown Classics (Kentucky Derby, Preakness Stakes, and Belmont Stakes).

Kentucky Derby Winners: Needles (1956), Tim Tam (1958), Carry Back (1961), Northern Dancer (1964), *Forward Pass (1968), Spectacular Bid (1979), Swale (1984), Unbridled (1990), Thunder Gulch (1995), Monarchos (2001), Barbaro (2006), Big Brown (2008), Orb (2013), Nyquist (2016), and Always Dreaming (2017).

Preakness Stakes Winners: Nashua (1955), Tim Tam (1958), Bally Ache (1960), Carry Back (1961), Candy Spots (1963), Northern Dancer (1964), Forward Pass (1968), Spectacular Bid (1979), Snow Chief (1986), and Big Brown (2008).

Belmont Stakes Winners: Nashua (1955), Needles (1956), Swale (1984), Thunder Gulch (1995), Empire Maker (2003), and Tiz the Law (2020).

In 1968, Dancer's Image won the Kentucky Derby, but was disqualified and moved to last place after traces of phenylbutazone (a drug that was illegal at the time) was found in a post-race urine analysis. Forward Pass, the Derby runner-up, was awarded the honor of first placing.

In 2019, Maximum Security won the Kentucky Derby, but was disqualified and moved to 17th place. This was the first disqualification due to a racing infraction in Kentucky Derby history.

Records
Speed Record:
 1:46.80 – Gen. Duke (1957), equaled the world record for  miles at the time.

Most wins by an owner:
 5 – Calumet Farm (1957, 1958, 1968, 1971, 1978)

Most wins by a jockey:
 5 – John R. Velazquez (2009, 2013, 2015, 2017,2018)

Most wins by a trainer:
 6 – Todd Pletcher (2007, 2014, 2015, 2017, 2018, 2021)

Largest margin of victory:
  lengths – Empire Maker (2003)

Shortest priced winners:
 $2.10 (1/20 on) – Honest Pleasure (1976), Spectacular Bid (1979)

Longest priced winner:
 $183.60 (~91/1) – Williamstown Kid (1966)

Winners

 Winners in bold won a Triple Crown Race

See also
Florida Derby "top three finishers" and starters
Road to the Kentucky Derby

References 

Horse races in Florida
Gulfstream Park
Flat horse races for three-year-olds
Triple Crown Prep Races
Grade 1 stakes races in the United States
Graded stakes races in the United States
Horse races established in 1952
1952 establishments in Florida